A total solar eclipse occurred at the Moon's ascending node of the orbit on March 29, 1987. It was a hybrid eclipse, with only a small portion of the central path as total, lasting a maximum of only 7.57 seconds. A solar eclipse occurs when the Moon passes between Earth and the Sun, thereby totally or partly obscuring the image of the Sun for a viewer on Earth. An annular solar eclipse occurs when the Moon's apparent diameter is smaller than the Sun's, blocking most of the Sun's light and causing the Sun to look like an annulus (ring). An annular eclipse appears as a partial eclipse over a region of the Earth thousands of kilometres wide. Totality of this eclipse was not visible on any land, while annularity was visible in southern Argentina, Gabon, Equatorial Guinea, Cameroon, Central African Republic, Sudan (part of the path of annularity crossed today's South Sudan), Ethiopia, Djibouti and Somaliland.

Related eclipses

Eclipses of 1987 
 A hybrid solar eclipse on March 29.
 A penumbral lunar eclipse on April 14.
 An annular solar eclipse on September 23.
 A penumbral lunar eclipse on October 7.

Solar eclipses of 1986–1989

Saros 129

Metonic series

Notes

References

1987 3 29
1987 in science
1987 3 29
March 1987 events
1987 in Gabon
1987 in Equatorial Guinea
1987 in Cameroon
1987 in the Central African Republic
1987 in Sudan
1987 in Ethiopia
1987 in Djibouti
1987 in Somalia
1987 in Argentina